Vince is a given name, it is the anglicisation and shortened form of the name Vincent, as well as a surname. 
It may refer to:

Given name

People 
 Vince Agnew (born 1987), American football player
 Vince Cable (born 1943), British politician
 Vince Carter (born 1977), basketball player
 Vince Catania (born 1977), Australian politician
 Vince Clarke (born 1960), English musician with Erasure
 Vince Clarke (cricketer) (born 1971), English cricketer
 Vince Coleman (disambiguation), multiple people
 Vince Courville (born 1959), American football player
 Vince DiMaggio (1912–1986), American baseball player, older brother of Joe DiMaggio
 Vince Dooley (born 1932), American football coach
 Vince Gill (born 1957), American country music singer, songwriter and musician
Vince Gilligan (born 1967), American writer, producer, as well as creator and director of AMC's Breaking Bad & spin-off Better Call Saul
 Vince Giordano (born 1952), American musician
 Vince Guaraldi (1928–1976), American jazz musician and pianist
 Vince Hill (born 1934), English singer and songwriter
 Vince Hill (American football) (born 1985), American football player
 Vince Lombardi (1913–1970), American football player, coach, and executive
 Vince Martin (disambiguation), multiple people
 Vince McMahon, Sr. (1914–1984), American wrestling promoter
 Vince McMahon (born 1945), CEO of World Wrestling Entertainment
 Vince Neil (born 1961), Lead singer, Mötley Crüe
 Vince Offer (born 1964), American-Israeli infomercial salesman, born Offer Shlomi
 Vince O'Sullivan (born 1957), American racewalker
 Vince Phillips (born 1963), American boxer and IBF champion
 Vince Powell (1928–2009), British sitcom writer
 Vince Promuto (1938–2021), American football player
 Vince Sorrenti, Australian actor
 Vince Staples (born 1993), American rapper
 Vince Steckler (1958–2021), American businessman
 Vince Vaughn (born 1970), American actor
 Vince Velasquez (born 1992), American Major League Baseball pitcher for the Philadelphia Phillies
 Vince White (born 1960), English guitarist with The Clash
 Vince Young (born 1983), American football player
 Vince Zizak (1908–1973), American football player

Fictional characters 
 Vince Clark, the main character in the British sitcom 15 Storeys High
 Vince LaSalle, main character of the American television series Recess
 Vince Noir, main character of the British comedy series The Mighty Boosh

Animals 
 Vince (rhinoceros) (2012–2017), killed by poachers while in a French zoo

Surname 
 Alan Vince (1952–2009), British archaeologist
 Allen Vince (ca. 1785–1849), settler in Texas
 Bernie Vince (born 1985), former Australian rules footballer
 Gaia Vince, British journalist, broadcaster and non-fiction author
 James Vince (born 1991), English cricketer
 John Vince (1849–1886), English cricketer
 Michael Vince (born 1947), British poet and author
 Pruitt Taylor Vince (born 1960), American actor
 Ralph Vince (1900–1996), American football player and coach, inventor of the football face mask
 Samuel Vince (1749–1821), English clergyman, mathematician and astronomer
 William Vince (1963–2008), Canadian film producer

See also
 Vicente (disambiguation)
 Vincent (disambiguation)
 Vincente
 Vincenzo

References

English masculine given names
Masculine given names
English-language surnames
Patronymic surnames
Hypocorisms
Surnames from given names